Jasim (also spelled Jasem) is a small city in the Izra' District of the Daraa Governorate in southern Syria. It is located 41 kilometers north of Daraa and is near the towns of Nawa to the south, Kafr Shams to the north, Inkhil to the northeast and al-Harra to the northwest. In the 2004 census by the Central Bureau of Statistics (CBS), Jasim had a population of 31,683.

History

Late antiquity 
Jasim is believed to be Gashmai, which was mentioned in the Mosaic of Rehob, as a town in the vicinity of Naveh (Nawa).

During the Byzantine period, Jasim was a seat of the Monophysite church in 570. It was controlled and populated by the Ghassanid Arabs, a vassal kingdom of the Byzantine Empire. There were five monasteries affiliated with the Monophysites located in the town. The Ghassanid king Nu'man was buried in between Jasim and nearby Tubna.

Middle ages 
The 10th-century Arab historian al-Masudi wrote that Jasim belonged to Damascus and was located "between Damascus and the Jordan Province, in a district called al-Khaulan. Jasim is a few miles from al-Jabiya, and from the territory of Nawa, where is the Pasturage of Ayyub."

Jasim was visited by Arab geographer Yaqut al-Hamawi in the early 13th-century under Ayyubid rule. Al-Hamawi wrote that the place was named after "Jasim, son of Iram ibn Sam (Shem) ibn Nuh (Noah) who visited it at the time of the destruction of the Tower of Babel." He further noted that Jasim was a town in Damascus Province, "lying 8 leagues from Damascus, on the right of the high-road to Tabbariyah (Tiberias)."

Ottoman period
In 1596 Jasim appeared in the Ottoman  tax registers being in the nahiya of Jaydur in the Hauran Sanjak. It had an entirely  Muslim population consisting  of 28 households and 14 bachelors. The villagers paid a fixed tax-rate of 40% on wheat, barley and summer crops; a total of 11,300  akçe. Half of the revenue went to  a waqf.

Many of the inhabitants of nearby al-Harra originate from Jasim. The city is home to the Arab tribe of al-Halqiyyin. Prominent 20th-century Arab socialist leader Akram al-Hawrani descends from the tribe, members of which settled in Homs. In the 1870s  Gottlieb Schumacher noted that Jasim was one of the largest villages in its region with a population of 1,000 living in 215 huts. He reported finding several ancient remains, particularly stone crosses from the Byzantine era.

Syrian civil war
Jasim was one of the first cities to participate in large-scale protests during the 2011-2012 Syrian uprising against the government on 18 March 2011. Further mass protests were reported on 22 April. On 1 April 2012, four Syrian Army soldiers were killed in clashes with rebel Free Syrian Army gunmen in Jasim according to the Syrian Observatory for Human Rights. On 15 January 2014, rebels were in control of Jasim.
On 17 July 2018, the Syrian army captured the town.

Notable natives
Abu Tammam, Abbasid era Arab poet.
Wael Nader Al-Halqi, former Prime Minister of Syria.

References

Bibliography

External links
Map of town, Google Maps
Naoua-map; 20L

Populated places in Izra' District
Towns in Syria